Étienne is a given name. Other uses include:

People
 Étienne (surname), a list of people named Étienne, Etienne or Ettienne
 Etienne (artist), pen name of Dom Orejudos (1933–1991), American erotic artist, dancer and choreographer
 Étienne (Canadian musician), stage name of Steven Langlois (born 1971), Canadian musician and educationist

Other uses
 "Étienne" (song), a 1987 single by French artist Guesch Patti
 Étienne (film), a 1933 French comedy drama film
 Etienne!, a 2009 film by Jeff Mizhushima
 Étienne Fjord, Graham Land, Antarctica